The fourth and final season of That's So Raven aired on Disney Channel from February 20, 2006 to November 10, 2007. This season ultimately became the final season of the show, closing the chapter on the story of the Baxter family, which now consists of only Raven Baxter (Raven-Symoné), Cory Baxter (Kyle Massey), and Victor Baxter (Rondell Sheridan), following T'Keyah Crystal Keymáh's departure from the show in the third season as the matriarch, Tanya Baxter. Anneliese van der Pol and Orlando Brown reprise their roles as Chelsea Daniels and Eddie Thomas respectively. 

After a record-breaking third season, season four continued to accomplish many firsts for Disney Channel. It reached 100 episodes with its series finale on November 10, 2007, a record which was met on October 7, 2011 with Wizards of Waverly Place'''s 100th episode. There would however be a continuity-error regarding the final three episodes, since they aired after the spinoff, Cory in the House'', premiered on January 12, 2007 with Cory and Victor moving to Washington, D.C. 

Guest stars for this season included: Rose Abdoo, Candace Cameron Bure, Rae Dawn Chong, Ashley Eckstein, Jasmine Guy, Sammi Hanratty, David Henrie, Richard Horvitz, Steve Hytner, Anne-Marie Johnson, Phill Lewis, Spencer Locke, Brooke Lyons, Kathy Najimy, Geoffrey Owens, Sydney Park, Tim Reid, Karly Rothenberg, Jodi Shilling, Maria Shriver, Cole and Dylan Sprouse, Bobb'e J. Thompson, Tiffany Thornton, Dorien Wilson, Annie Wood and Amy Yasbeck.

Production
The season was filmed from July 15, 2005 to January 13, 2006 and Raven-Symoné is credited as one of the show's producers.

Cast 
Raven-Symoné as Raven Baxter
Orlando Brown as Eddie Thomas
Anneliese van der Pol as Chelsea Daniels
Kyle Massey as Cory Baxter
Rondell Sheridan as Victor Baxter

Production staff 
Marc Warren - executive producer
Dennis Rinsler - executive producer
Michael Carrington - co-executive producer
Michael Feldman - supervising producer
Al Sonja Rice - consulting producer
Patty Gary Cox - co-executive producer 
Raven-Symone - producer

Episodes

References

2006 American television seasons
2007 American television seasons
Season 4